Wauhatchie Branch is a stream in the U.S. states of Georgia and Tennessee. It is a tributary to Lookout Creek.

Wauhatchie Branch was named after Wauhatchie, a Cherokee leader.

References

Rivers of Georgia (U.S. state)
Rivers of Tennessee
Rivers of Dade County, Georgia
Rivers of Hamilton County, Tennessee